The following is a list of ice hockey players who have recorded 1,000 assists in the National Hockey League (NHL).

Players with 1,000 NHL assists

Jagr is also the only non-Canadian player with 1,000 career assists.

Retired players within 100 assists
These are players who are now retired that came within 100 assists of reaching 1,000 for their career. They are listed with the NHL team for which they played the most games.

References

1000 assists